Martinez Creek may refer to the following watercourses:

 California
 Martinez Creek (S. Fork San Jacinto River), is a stream in Riverside County, California

 Texas
 Martinez Creek (San Antonio, Texas) in San Antonio, Bexar County, Texas.		
 Martinez Creek (Martinez, Texas) with source near Martinez in Bexar County, Texas, and mouth in Wilson County, Texas.	
 Martinez Creek (Goliad County) near Goliad, Goliad County, Texas.

References